Jessica Fridrich is a professor at Binghamton University, who specializes in data hiding applications in digital imagery. She is also known for documenting and popularizing the CFOP method (sometimes referred to as the "Fridrich method"), one of the most commonly used methods for speedsolving the Rubik's Cube, also known as speedcubing. She is considered one of the pioneers of speedcubing, along with Lars Petrus. Nearly all of the fastest speedcubers have based their methods on Fridrich's, usually referred to as CFOP, that is, (Cross, First 2 Layers, Orientation of the Last Layer, Permutation of the Last Layer).

The method describes solving the cube in a layer-by-layer fashion. First a "cross" is made on the first layer, consisting of the center piece and four edges (Cross). Next, the first layer's corners and edges of the second layer are put into their correct positions simultaneously in pairs (F2L). The last layer is solved by first orienting the yellow pieces (OLL) and then permuting the last layer of the cube using a few sets of algorithms (PLL).

Career
Jessica Fridrich works as a professor at the Department of Electrical and Computer Engineering at Binghamton University and specializes in digital watermarking and forensics. She received her MS degree in applied mathematics from the Czech Technical University in Prague in 1987, and her PhD in systems science from Binghamton University in 1995. In 2018, Fridrich was elected a fellow of the National Academy of Inventors.

References

External links
  Jessica Fridrich's webpage
 Rubik's Cube World Championship in Budapest in 1982
 Rubik's Cube competition rankings
 Jessica Fridich : page en français

Living people
Czech speedcubers
Czech emigrants to the United States
Binghamton University faculty
State University of New York faculty
American electrical engineers
Czech women computer scientists
Year of birth missing (living people)
Fellows of the National Academy of Inventors